The list of ambassadors from Germany to South Korea began after the Federal Republic of Germany (then West Germany, today Germany) recognised the Republic of Korea (South Korea) in December 1955. The official title of this diplomat is "Ambassador of the Federal Republic of Germany to the Republic of Korea."

Historical relations
Diplomatic relations between the German Empire and Korea were established in 1883, during the Gründerzeit period of the German Empire and the Joseon Dynasty period of Korean history. However, the Korean Empire lost its right to conduct foreign policy due to the Japan–Korea Treaty of 1905. Germany did not recognise the Provisional Government of the Republic of Korea in exile in Shanghai (the self-asserted successor to the Korean Empire).

The consuls-general and consuls of the German Empire to the Joseon Dynasty and then the Korean Empire were:
 Capt. Zembisch, appointed November 18, 1884
 H. Budler, acting consul-general from August 11, 1885
 T. Kempermann, appointed May 17, 1886
 F. Krien, acting consul-general May 22, 1887; appointed April 27, 1889
 F. Reinsdorf, acting consul from December 5, 1898
 H. Weipert, acting consul from April 1, 1900; appointed September 29, 1900

List of heads of mission

Ambassadors of the Federal Republic of Germany to the Republic of Korea 
 Richard Hertz, 1956–1960
 Karl Bunger, 1960–1964
 Franz Ferring, 1964–1969
 Wilfried Sarrazin, 1969–1975
 Karl Leuteritz, 1975–1980
 Wolfgang Eger, 1980–1985
 Jűrgen Kleiner, 1985–1992
 Dieter Siemes, 1992–1995
 Claus Vollers, 1995–2000
 Hubertus von Morr, 2000–2003
 Michael Geier, 2003–2006
 Norbert Baas, 2006–2009
 Hans-Ulrich Seidt, 2009–2012
 Rolf Mafael, 2012–2016
 Stephen Auer, 2016–2020
 Michael Reiffenstuel, 2020–present

See also
 Germany-Korea Treaty of 1883
 List of diplomatic missions in South Korea

Notes

References
 Halleck, Henry Wager. (1861).  International law: or, Rules regulating the intercourse of states in peace and war. New York: D. Van Nostrand. OCLC 852699
 Korean Mission to the Conference on the Limitation of Armament, Washington, D.C., 1921-1922. (1922). Korea's Appeal to the Conference on Limitation of Armament. Washington: U.S. Government Printing Office. OCLC 12923609

 
South Korea
Germany